"Lloro Por Ti" is the second single released by Enrique Iglesias from his compilation album Enrique Iglesias: 95/08 Éxitos. The song was released as an official single in July 2008.

Enrique Iglesias performed "Lloro Por Ti" on 17 July 2008 on the Premios Juventud along with Aventura.

As of 2010, "Lloro Por Ti" has sold around 700,000 digital downloads worldwide, making it one of Iglesias' best selling Spanish songs.

Music video
The music video premiered on 30 June 2008 on Ritmoson Latino and can be seen on Iglesias official Vevo channel on YouTube.

Remix version
The official remix of "Lloro Por Ti" features Puerto Rican duo Wisin & Yandel. The video of the remix was shot in Los Angeles, and premiered on MTV Tr3́s.

Chart performance
After being in the top 10 on the Hot Latin Tracks chart for nearly two months, "Lloro Por Ti" hit number one on 8 November. It further remained on the top for 2 weeks; "Lloro Por Ti" is Iglesias' twentieth number-one hits on the chart.

Charts

See also
List of number-one Billboard Hot Latin Songs of 2008

References

2008 singles
Enrique Iglesias songs
Wisin & Yandel songs
Pop ballads
Songs written by Enrique Iglesias
Songs written by Descemer Bueno
2008 songs
Songs written by Wisin
Songs written by Yandel